Astragalus sinicus is a species of milkvetch in the family Fabaceae. It is known under such common names as Chinese milkvetch (or milk-vetch) and is in common use in farming as a green manure. It is not to be confused with Astragalus propinquus, the plant yielding Radix Astragali for Chinese medicine.

References

External links
 On Wikimedia For media relating to this species.
 On Plants For a Future With bibliography.
 Online text of King, F. H. 1911
 Food and Agriculture Organization of the United Nations with link to photos

sinicus